The John W. Lederle Graduate Research Center, also known as Lederle Tower or LGRT, is a building in Amherst, Massachusetts. It is part of the University of Massachusetts Amherst. It contains research laboratories, conference rooms, and offices for many departments within the College of Natural Sciences. There is also a substantial amount of classroom space, formerly teaching laboratories, and a large seminar room. The building is also connected to the Lederle Lowrise and other surrounding buildings.

The buildings adjacent Lowrise is home to the Science and Engineering Library, one of the two Libraries at the UMass Amherst Campus, the other being the W.E.B. Du Bois Library.

References

External links
Lederle Graduate Research Center at emporis.com

1970s architecture in the United States
University of Massachusetts Amherst buildings